Acul-du-Nord is a commune in the Acul-du-Nord Arrondissement, in the Nord department of Haiti.

Communal sections 
The commune consists of six communal sections, namely:
 Camp-Louise, urban (Camp Louise neighborhood) and rural
 Bas de l'Acul, urban (town of Acul du Nord) and rural
 Mornet, rural
 Grande Ravine, rural
 Coupe à David, rural
 La Soufrière, urban (Soufrière neighborhood) and rural

References

Populated places in Nord (Haitian department)
Communes of Haiti